Kosmos 2430 ( meaning Cosmos 2430) was a Russian US-K missile early warning satellite which was launched in 2007 as part of the Russian Space Forces' Oko programme. The satellite was designed to identify missile launches using optical telescopes and infrared sensors.

Kosmos 2430 was launched from Site 16/2 at Plesetsk Cosmodrome in Russia. A Molniya-M carrier rocket with a 2BL upper stage was used to perform the launch, which took place at 04:39 UTC on 23 October 2007. The launch successfully placed the satellite into a molniya orbit. It subsequently received its Kosmos designation, and the international designator 2007-049A. The United States Space Command assigned it the Satellite Catalog Number 32268.

In May 2012, it did not perform a manoeuvre and drifted off station.

On 5 January 2019, it was caught on video as it de-orbited over the North Island of New Zealand.

See also

List of Kosmos satellites (2251–2500)
List of R-7 launches (2005–2009)
2007 in spaceflight
List of Oko satellites

References

Kosmos satellites
Spacecraft launched in 2007
Oko
Spacecraft launched by Molniya-M rockets
Spacecraft which reentered in 2019